Wrapped Reichstag, Project for Berlin was a 1995 environmental artwork in which artists Christo and Jeanne-Claude wrapped the Berlin Reichstag building in fabric.

History
A German citizens' group unsuccessfully advocated for the project in 1978 but the building, which held deep German national identity symbolism prior to reunification, required unavailable political will. Rita Süssmuth, the newly-elected President of the Bundestag, expressed interest in the project in 1989, precipitating its approval.  The project had been rejected three times across six Bundestag presidents and 24 years before its 1994 vote for approval. Wrapped Reichstag mounted in 1995 for two weeks as 100,000 square meters of silver fabric draped the building and fastened with blue rope. The Reichstag, which had not been in use, was later reconstructed for parliamentary use in 1999. Christo described the Reichstag wrapping as autobiographical. It became symbolic of unified Germany and marked Berlin's return as a world city. The Guardian posthumously described the work as the pair's "most spectacular achievement".

Notes

Bibliography 

 
 
 
 
 
 
 
 
 
 
 
 
 Christo und Jeanne-Claude: Wrapped Reichstag. Berlin 1971–95. Taschen, Köln 2002, .
 Jacob Baal-Teshuva (Hrsg.): Christo, der Reichstag und urbane Projekte. Prestel, München 1993, .
 Jacob Baal-Teshuva: Christo & Jeanne-Claude, mit Fotografien von Wolfgang Volz, Benedikt Taschen Verlag, Köln 1995. .
 Burt Chernow: XTO + J-C. List, München 2002, .
 Henning Ritter: Die Liebe der Massen zur Kunst. Christos Triumph. 1995. In: Die Wiederkehr der Wunderkammer. Über Kunst und Künstler, Hanser, Berlin 2014, S. 240–247.

External links 

1995 works
Works by Christo and Jeanne-Claude
1995 in Berlin
Reichstag building